Hilarion is a male form of a Latin-derived name, related to the name Hilary which in modern times is mainly feminine.

People with the given name Hilarion 
 Hilarion the Great (291–371), anchorite
 Hilarion the Younger (8th/9th century), Byzantine abbot
 Hilarion the Iberian (born c. 822), Georgian monk
 Hilarion Alfeyev (born 1966), orthodox bishop, church historian, and composer
 Hilarión Daza (1840–1894), President of Bolivia from 1876–1879
 Hilarion of Kiev (11th century), Russian Orthodox bishop
 Hilarion-Pit Lessard (1913–1984), Canadian politician
 Hilarion (Prikhodko) (1924–2008), Russian Orthodox priest in Novgorod 
 Hilarion Vendégou (1941–2020), high chief of the Isle of Pines in New Caledonia
 Master Hilarion, an Ascended Master in Theosophy
 Metropolitan Ilarion or Hilarion, various Eastern Orthodox bishops
 Anne-Hilarion de Cotentin de Tourville (1642–1701), French naval commander

People with the surname Hilarion 
 Auguste Hilarion, comte de Kératry (1769–1859), French poet, novelist, short story writer, literary critic, historian, and politician

Fictional characters
 Prince Hilarion, one of the protagonists in the Gilbert & Sullivan comic opera Princess Ida
 Hilarion (Giselle), a gamekeeper in Adolphe Adam's romantic ballet

See also
 Saint-Hilarion, a commune in France
 Ilarion, a variant of the name